N. P. Ogarev's Mordovia State University (MSUO or OMSU for Ogarev Mordovia State University, or MRSU for Мордовский государственный университет имени Н. П. Огарева, Mordovskyi Gosudarstvennyi Universitet (imeni N. P. Ogareva)) is located in the city of Saransk in the Republic of Mordovia, Russia. The university offers bachelor's and master's degrees in various academic fields.

History 
The Agronomy Pedagogical Institute, also known as the Mordovia State Pedagogical Institute, was founded on 1 October 1931. In October 1957, it was reorganized as Mordovia State University also known as Ogarev Mordovia State University. It achieved national research university status on 20 May 2010.

Teaching formats 

The courses are available in the form of full-time education, evening (part-time) curriculum, and correspondence education (6 years). The medical faculty offers 6 and 7-year programs of study.

Student body 

The total student body numbers approximately 28,000 students, including international students from countries like India, Pakistan, Bangladesh, Kuwait, Oman, Iran, Iraq, Saudi, UAE and few African countries.

Units
Academic disciplines are offered through following academic structural units:

Academic department 
Biology, 
Medicine, 
Philology, 
Foreign Languages (English, German, French), 
Geography, 
Law / Jurisprudence, 
Economics, 
National (Mordvin) Culture, 
Civil Engineering and Building Constructions, 
Lighting Technology, 
Electronics, 
Academic Skills College,
Math and IT.

Colleges (institutes)
Physics and Chemistry Institute 
History and Sociology Institute 
Mechanics and Power Engineering Institute 
Agrarian Institute 
Machine Building Institute (Ruzayevka campus ) 
Institute for Supplementary Training and Qualification Improvement with

A range of related faculties are grouped within the Inter-branch Regional Centre for Supplementary Training.

In addition, University divisions in other towns of Mordovia provide for educating facilities in Economics and Law Studies.

References

External links 
 

Universities and institutes established in the Soviet Union
Universities in Volga Region
Buildings and structures in Mordovia
Educational institutions established in 1957
Saransk
1957 establishments in the Soviet Union
National research universities in Russia